Zhang Zhizhen (born 16 October 1996), is a Chinese professional tennis player. In 2021, Zhang became the first Chinese man in Open era to play in the main draw at Wimbledon. He reached his career-high singles ranking of world No. 91 on 6 February 2023, and his career-high doubles ranking of world No. 211 in September 2017. He has won two singles and two doubles titles on the ATP Challenger, and two singles and two doubles titles on the ITF Futures Tour. In October 2022, he became the first Chinese player to reach the top 100 in the ATP singles rankings.

Career

2012–2014: ITF debut 
Zhizhen Zhang began his career in Chico, California, playing on the ITF Futures Tour. Despite losing to Jason Jung in straight sets, Zhang rebounded at the Joplin Futures tournament, recording his first win as a professional against Daniel Yoo, before losing in straight sets to unranked American Gonzales Austin. Zhang lost in the first round of the following two futures tournaments he entered. At the 2012 Shanghai Rolex Masters, Zhang – only sixteen at the time – was given a wild card entry into the qualifying draw; he lost to world number sixty one Brian Baker, winning just three games in his debut clash with a top one hundred ATP player. 

After a six month hiatus from professional events, Zhang made his 2013 ITF Men's Circuit debut in May at the USA F12 challenger, where Greg Ouellette got the better of the youngster in three sets. Zhang continued to play professional events sporadically, managing to come through qualifying to make the 2013 Shanghai Challenger's main draw – his first ATP Challenger Tour appearance. Zhang would skip half of the 2014 ITF Men's Circuit, finishing the year with only thirteen participations in senior-level events, including a quarterfinal showing at a Futures tournament in Cyprus.

2015: ATP debut
March brought Zhang his first victories of 2015, where he bested Jan Zieliński and top-400 player Bastian Trinker in Turkey's 11th Futures event of the year. Zhang struggled to maintain consistent form in the following months, exiting in the opening two rounds of every tournament he played in, before winning the Mont-de-Marsan Futures tournament in June; this was Zhang's first ITF World Tennis Tour title. French tournaments continued being the bearers of good results for Zhang, as he backed up his maiden Futures title with a second final three weeks later, this time in Bourg-en-Bresse.

His ranking bolstered by positive results on the 2015 ITF Men's Circuit, Zhang began entering tournaments on the 2015 ATP Challenger Tour, though he failed to win any main-draw matches in his first few months on the higher-level Challenger Tour. Zhang then made his ATP tour debut at the 2015 Shenzhen Open. As a qualifier, he defeated Japanese Go Soeda in straight sets in the first round, before losing to sixth-seed Jiří Veselý in straight sets.

Zhang played in the qualifying draws of both the Beijing Open, and the Shanghai Masters, though he failed to breach the main draw of either venue. Zhang rounded out the year with a few early losses in Challenger tournaments.

2016: Loss of form 
Zhang inexplicably missed the first four months of the 2016 ATP World Tour, and when he did arrive, he returned on the 2016 ITF Men's Circuit. Zhang lost early through much of April and May, though he did manage to play in both a 2016 ATP Challenger Tour event, and the qualifying draw of the ATP Tour 250 tournament in Nice, the Open de Nice where he lost a third set tiebreaker to future world No. 1, Daniil Medvedev, in the second round of qualifying. 

Excluding one quarterfinal at the Futures level, Zhang lost in the first or second round of every tournament main draw he played in. Zhang finished the year outside the top 800, a drop of four-hundred ranking places from the previous year.

2017: Two Futures titles, ATP Tour quarterfinal
Zhang's ranking hovered 800 from September, 2016, to May 2017, when the Chinese youngster, still only twenty years old, reached a third Futures final, this time in Lu'an, China. Zhang lost in the final to American Alexander Sarkissian. Now ranked just outside of the top-700, Zhang continued his ascent, winning the Shenzhen Futures tournament, and losing in the finals of another futures tournament in China (the Yinchuan Futures tournament) two weeks later. Zhang then began competing on the 2017 ATP Challenger Tour, and for the first time, he had no need to play qualifying draws to enter said Challenger Tour events. 

After a couple months of early losses on the Challenger Tour, Zhang rebounded at the 2017 Shenzhen Open. As a qualifier, Zhang upset 4th seed and world No. 39 Paolo Lorenzi in the second round, subsequently losing to Henri Laaksonen in the last eight. On the 26th of November, 2017, after defeating Te Rigele in a three-set final, Zhang won the China Tennis Grand Prix Cup title for the first time. With his newfound success at both the Futures and Tour Levels, Zhang finished 2017 ranked in the top 350.

2018: ATP Challenger semifinal 
Zhang spent the first half of 2018 losing early on both the 2018 ATP Challenger Tour and the 2018 ITF Men's Circuit. Zhang reached a sixth futures final, losing to Jelle Sels in Casina. Zhang's surge in form continued, with a semifinal appearance at the 2018 Jinan International Open. Zhang then lost to Andy Murray in Shenzhen, retiring due to injury halfway through the third set. Zhang recovered in time for both the 2018 China Open, and the 2018 Shanghai Rolex Masters, although he failed to win matches in either.

2019: Two Challenger titles, China's No. 1 player, top 150 debut
Zhang started his 2019 season with back-to-back quarterfinal showings on the 2019 ITF Men's World Tennis Tour. Zhang then transitioned to the 2019 ATP Challenger Tour, where he reached the round of sixteen in Anning, followed by a quarterfinal loss to Ramkumar Ramanathan at the 2019 ATP Challenger China International – Nanchang. Zhang lost early in his next three challenger tournaments. June's Columbus Challenger saw Zhang return to the later rounds, with another quarterfinal defeat. Zhang's fifth quarterfinal (including both the Futures and Challenger tours' tournaments) was also a defeat; he fell to Bai Yan at the 2019 Chengdu Challenger.

The fall hard-court swing saw Zhang's best results to date. He won the 2019 Jinan International Open, beating top one-hundred player Soonwoo Kwon en route. He also reached the second round of both the 2019 Zhuhai Championships and the 2019 China Open, with the latter being a loss to top-five player and eventual champion Dominic Thiem.

October handed Zhang his ATP Tour Masters 1000 main draw debut: a defeat to Hubert Hurkacz at the 2019 Rolex Shanghai Masters. Zhang concluded October with a second Challenger crown, ousting Li Zhe in the final round of the 2019 Shenzhen Longhua Open.

Zhang finished 2019 ranked 138. A career high year-end ranking.

2020–2021: Historic Wimbledon debut
Zhang skipped most of the already abridged 2020 ATP Tour season. He played and lost in the first round of the 2020 Tata Open Maharashtra, and failed to progress past qualifying at the 2020 Dubai Tennis Championships. After the onset of the Coronavirus pandemic, Zhang did not play again until the following year.

Zhang started his 2021 year with a first-round loss at the 2021 İstanbul Challenger, and a second round loss in Dubai, ending his hopes of qualifying for the 2021 Australian Open (the qualifiers were held in Dubai due to coronavirus restrictions and concerns). Grinding through the 2021 ATP Challenger Tour with few victories, Zhang's drought ended with a semifinal placing at the Biella Challenger Indoor. Zhang fell short of qualifying for the 2021 French Open, thus concluding his clay season.

After playing (and losing in the second round) at the 2021 Nottingham Trophy, Zhang qualified for a Grand Slam main draw at the 2021 Wimbledon Championships; his first appearance in a main draw at a Major level. He became the first male Chinese in the Open Era to qualify at Wimbledon. He was also only the fourth Chinese man to play singles in the main draw of any Grand Slam since 1968, with the others being Wu Di at the Australian Open in 2013, 2014 and 2016, Zhang Ze at the Australian Open in 2014 and 2015, and Li Zhe at the 2019 Australian Open.

Zhang's 2021 season abruptly ended with an injury obtained against Federico Delbonis in Hamburg. Zhang finished the year outside the top three-hundred, despite peaking just outside of the top-one-hundred in the ATP rankings earlier in the season.

2022: US Open debut, second ATP quarterfinal & historic top 100
The San Luis Potosi Challenger in April was Zhang's first quarterfinal appearance at any level in 2022. Having lost early or in qualifying for many previous events on the 2022 ATP Challenger Tour, Zhang finally managed to progress beyond the second round at a tournament for the first time in almost a year. The following week in Florida, at the 2022 Tallahassee Tennis Challenger, Zhang made it to the last four, losing to Wu Tung-lin in two close sets. Zhang then made a Challenger quarterfinal for the third week in a row, losing to former top-ten player and 2017 Rolex Paris Masters champion Jack Sock in the final eight. A couple weeks later, and Zhang would again find himself in a Challenger semifinal, this time at the 2022 Tunis Open.

Zhang failed to reach the Wimbledon Championships' main draw again, losing in the second round of qualifying to Daniel Masur. Zhang returned to the Challenger tour after his loss to Masur, opting to play the 2022 Platzmann-Sauerland Open. He reached the final without dropping a set, eliminating both third-seeded Manuel Guinard and seventh-seeded Pablo Cuevas en route. Eighteen year-old Serbian Hamad Međedović downed Zhang in less than an hour. This was Zhang's first appearance in a challenger final since 2019. Zhang next travelled to Braunschweig with a special exemption entry into the Brawo Open. Zhang would reach the semifinals in Braunschweig, defeating world No. 51, Pedro Martínez, and 2018 French Open semifinalist Marco Cecchinato. Maximilian Marterer bested Zhang in a three-set match to reach the final, despite Zhang holding numerous match points.

Zhang entered the 2022 Internazionali di Tennis Città di Trieste Challenger as a qualifier, defeating fifth-seeded Marco Cecchinato and eighth-seeded Alexandre Müller en route to the final, where he lost to Francesco Passaro despite clinching the first set. Zhang re-entered the top-200 for the first time since he injured himself at the 2021 Hamburg European Open. Zhang reached a second straight Challenger Tour final at the 2022 Internazionali di Tennis del Friuli Venezia Giulia in Cordenons, Italy upsetting fourth seed Pavel Kotov in the first round, and Alexandre Müller in the semifinals to reach the final. It was Zhang's third Challenger final in one month, and the fifth of his career. He rallied after losing the first set against Andrea Vavassori, defeating the home-crowd favorite in three sets to lift the title – Zhang's first Challenger title in nearly three years. Zhang rose to world No. 157 in the ATP rankings following Cordenons, his highest ranking in two and a half years.

At his first hardcourt tournament since June, Zhang reached the final in Poland, defeating former junior number one Harold Mayot in the semifinals, as well as ATP Tour champion Robin Haase in the final eight. He lost to fifth-seeded Tomáš Macháč in the final, despite winning the first set six games to one. Zhang’s run elevated his ranking to No. 138, placing him within two spots of his career-high ranking.

He made his debut at the US Open, qualifying for the main draw alongside his friend Yibing Wu, making history for his country. He narrowly missed being the first Chinese male national to win a major main-draw match in 63 years after losing to Tim van Rijthoven, failing to convert seven match points in the third set.

At the 2022 Astana Open he qualified into the main draw and defeated Aslan Karatsev for his second ATP 500-level win. He lost to fifth seed Andrey Rublev in the second round. As a result he reached a new career-high ranking of No. 110 on 10 October 2022. After qualifying for Naples, Zhang beat Márton Fucsovics and sixth seed Sebastián Báez in straight sets to reach his first ATP Tour-level quarterfinal for the season and first since 2017. As a result, he became the first Chinese male player in the Open era to reach the top 100.

Performance timelines

Singles

Doubles

ATP Challenger and ITF Futures finals

Singles: 12 (5 titles, 7 runner-ups)

Doubles: 10 (4–6)

References

External links
 
 
 

Living people
1996 births
Chinese male tennis players
Tennis players at the 2018 Asian Games
Tennis players from Shanghai
Asian Games competitors for China